Ectecephala albistylum is a species of grass fly in the family Chloropidae.

References

External links

 

Chloropinae
Articles created by Qbugbot
Insects described in 1851